The Tear the Signs Down album tour was a tour by the Welsh rock band The Automatic, in support of their third album Tear the Signs Down. The band made their live comeback at Cardiff Barfly on 19 September 2009 and soon after announced a string of dates in November where they would preview new material from their then upcoming album. The band undertook a full UK tour, with plans to tour in Europe and America.

Background
During 2009 the band only played a handful of dates, Jarocin Festival in Poland and Tamworth Midlands Music Festival in July and August, and then their 'comeback performance' on 19 September 2009 in their native Cardiff at Barfly, where they performed new material for the first time. Soon after they announced a small 10 date tour across parts of the United Kingdom, in November 2009. Prior to the November tour the full album tour was also announced, across the England, Scotland and Wales in March 2010. Three sold out London dates were at the start of the tour, at Hoxton Bar and Kitchen, The Borderline and Camden Barfly.

During the March 2010 tour dates the band were supported by Straight Lines and White Belt Yellow Tag. Throughout the tour The Automatic ran a competition via Twitter, giving fans the chance to win a free guest list place every night of the tour.

After the March 2010 tour the band played sporadic gigs and festivals across the summer. They were also favoured to support Ash in April or May on tour, this never became. In late June The Blackout supported The Automatic at a charity performance at Pontypridd Muni Arts Centre, whilst later in July The Automatic supported Funeral for a Friend on their Casually Dressed & Deep in Conversation tour dates.

Reception
Despite NME's poor reaction to the album Tear the Signs Down the magazine praised the performance at Liverpool on 14 March 2010 - also contradicting their album review calling Tear the Signs Down "an impressive third record", Mike Haydock wrote "They look happy, and it's infectious, translating into a hugely impressive, enjoyable show that puts smiles on people's faces. And surely that's the whole point, right?", noting also that hit singles "Steve McQueen", "Monster", "Raoul" and "Recover" all gained the most response.

Set list
Many of the tracks from Tear the Signs Down have been alternated throughout the tour, with "Run and Hide", "Interstate", "Something Else" and "Cannot Be Saved" remaining present at all dates. "Steve McQueen", "Magazines", "This Is A Fix" and "Light Entertainment" along with an alternation of Sleepwalking and other tracks from This Is A Fix. "Monster", "Campaign Trail", "Raoul" and "Recover" have all been present from Not Accepted Anywhere whilst "That's What She Said" and "By My Side" have been included on occasion. You Shout, Keep Your Eyes Peeled, Seriously I Hate You Guys, Team Drama and Rats have yet to be performed with Paul Mullen as a member of The Automatic.

 Interstate
 Recover
 Magazines
 Run and Hide
 Raoul
 Race to the Heart of the Sun
 Monster
 Something Else
 This Is A Fix
 Can I Take You Home
 On The Campaign Trail
 Sleepwalking
 Cannot Be Saved
 Light Entertainment
 Steve McQueen

Tour dates

References 

The Automatic
2009 concert tours
2010 concert tours